Dijkzigt is an underground subway station in the city of Rotterdam, and is served by Rotterdam Metro lines A, B, and C. The station is located next to the Erasmus MC (the biggest hospital in the Netherlands) and the Erasmus University. Dijkzigt station was opened on 10 May 1982 as a station of the East-West Line (or Caland line). The station is located underneath the Rochussenstraat and there is interchange with buslines 44 and 46.

The station hall houses a small RET office and a few shops.

Public Art

In 2015, artist Peter Jansen and PolyVision were commissioned to create the "Flat Earth" mural for the Dijkzigt Metro Station. "Flat Earth" consists of 1,250 digital prints of photographs taken by Jansen during the 20 years he spent traveling around the world. The images are arranged in a panorama-like manner. The mural was unveiled in April 2016.

References

External links

Rotterdam Metro stations
Railway stations opened in 1982
1982 establishments in the Netherlands
Railway stations in the Netherlands opened in the 20th century